The Son of Tarzan   is a novel by American writer Edgar Rice Burroughs, the fourth in his series of twenty-four books about the title character Tarzan. It was written between January 21 and May 11, 1915, and first published in the magazine All-Story Weekly as a six-part serial from December 4, 1915 to January 8, 1916. It was first published in book form by A. C. McClurg & Co. in March 1917 and has been reprinted numerous times since by various publishers.

Plot summary
In this novel, for the first and only time in the Tarzan series, the main character is not Tarzan himself but his son Jack, who becomes known as Korak, first introduced (as a baby) in the earlier novels The Eternal Lover (1914/15) and The Beasts of Tarzan (1914). Korak would return as a supporting character in the later novels Tarzan the Terrible (1921), Tarzan and the Golden Lion (1922/23) and Tarzan and the Ant Men (1924).

The story begins 10 years after the conclusion of The Beasts of Tarzan. During the past decade, Alexis Paulvitch, who had escaped Tarzan at the end of the last novel, has lived a hideous life of abuse and disease among tribal people in Africa. Now he is discovered by a European ship and taken aboard. In the months that follows, Paulvitch encounters the ape, Akut, (whom Tarzan had befriended in that previous story) at one of the ship's stops. Because of Akut's interactions with Tarzan, he is unafraid of white men, and Paulvitch, unaware of the previous relationship, sees an opportunity to make some money.  He takes Akut to London and begins displaying him publicly.

After the trauma of the kidnappings ten years earlier, Jane has refused to return to Africa or to allow Jack to know anything about his father's past for fear that he might somehow try to relive it. Perhaps she instinctively knew that Jack was somehow very connected to Tarzan's old life, for Jack did have an avid interest in wildlife and he was extremely athletic. When the Claytons hear about the displayed ape, they forbid Jack from going to see it.  But he sneaks off and does so anyway.  John Clayton follows his son and is surprised to find the ape is his old friend, Akut, and begins conversing with him. Jack is amazed to see that his father could do so. John then tells Jack of his life as Tarzan.

Jack continues sneaking away to see Akut and begins to learn the language of the apes. Jack forms a plan to take Akut back to the jungle. Paulvitch, seeing an opportunity for revenge against Tarzan, agrees to help Jack. They escape to an African port where Paulvitch attacks Jack. Akut kills Paulvitch, and Jack, terrified, escapes into the jungle with him, thinking he will have to run for the rest of his life.

Like Tarzan before him, Jack learns survival in the jungle and encounters the Mangani apes, whom he can speak with because of his dialogue with Akut. Akut has difficulty pronouncing the name "Jack" and names him Korak, which means "killer" which seems appropriate since Jack has proven himself to be such.

Jack finds an abused girl of about 11 named Meriem and rescues her. He begins teaching her to survive the jungle and they begin a sibling type relationship and live adventurously in the jungle for several years.

In the interim, Tarzan and Jane have begun living at their Waziri estate in Africa again, not having any idea what became of their son. After about six years, Tarzan and Jane reunite with Korak (now about 18) and Meriem (now 16) and return to London where Korak and Meriem are married.

Adaptations
Burroughs' novel was the basis of the fifteen part silent film serial of the same title, the first part of which was released in 1920.

The book has been adapted into comic form by Gold Key Comics in Tarzan no. 158, dated March 1967, with a script by Gaylord DuBois and art by Russ Manning. DC Comics also began an adaptation in its Korak comic, but adapted only the initial portion of the story, using it as the springboard for original stories featuring Korak's quest for a kidnapped Meriem. The comic book magazine Korak, Son of Tarzan, generally focusing on other adventures of the protagonist, was issued from 1963-1975 by both publishers in succession, nos. 1-45 (cover dated Jan. 1964-Jan. 1972) by Gold Key The title of the magazine was then changed to The Tarzan Family, and continued publication under that title by DC from 1975-1976 (nos. 60-66, cover dated Nov./Dec. 1975-Nov./Dec. 1976).

References

External links

 
Text of the novel at Project Gutenberg

ERBzine.com Illustrated Bibliography: The Son of Tarzan
Edgar Rice Burroughs Summary Project page for The Son of Tarzan

1915 American novels
1915 fantasy novels
American fantasy novels adapted into films
Tarzan novels by Edgar Rice Burroughs
Novels first published in serial form
Works originally published in Argosy (magazine)
A. C. McClurg books